Karel Rychlík (1885–1968) was a Czechoslovak mathematician who contributed significantly to the fields of algebra, number theory, mathematical analysis, and the history of mathematics.

External links
Extensive Biography
Works

Czechoslovak mathematicians
1885 births
1968 deaths